The Judge Jonathan Hasbrouck House, also known as the Sherman-Elwyn-Jonathan Hasbrouck House, is a historic home located at Woodstock, Ulster County, New York.  It was built circa 1800, and is a two-story, three bay by four bay, Federal style, bluestone dwelling constructed with load-bearing walls upon a raised basement.  It has a gable roof and front porch that was added around 1900.  Adjoining the eastern elevation of the house is a wooden frame addition also on a bluestone foundation that was built about 1875.  The addition exhibits modern construction techniques since its renovation after a fire that had damaged both sections of the house.  The original roof pitch of the addition has since been reconfigured.

The main house was built on a 500-acre parcel for Jonathan Hasbrouck (1763-1846), a large landowner and Ulster County judge.

The house currently stands on an approximate one-acre parcel with a contributing timber-frame shed on the west side.  Included within the NRHP nomination boundary of the site is a historically relevant barn complex (built circa 1875) that is located on the abutting property to the east, along with a non-contributing small-frame dwelling.

It was listed on the National Register of Historic Places in 2013.

References

External links

Houses on the National Register of Historic Places in New York (state)
Houses completed in 1800
Federal architecture in New York (state)
Houses in Ulster County, New York
National Register of Historic Places in Ulster County, New York